Right Between the Eyes is a 1989 album by American heavy metal band Icon. It marked a number of changes for the band, including a new record label, Megaforce Worldwide/ Atlantic Records and new guitarist Drew Bollmann, who was listed as a member although he did not actually play on the album. The album was produced by guitarist Dan Wexler, Dan Zelisko, and radio personality Eddie Trunk (credited as "Ed Trunk"), who worked at Megaforce at the time. The album featured a guest vocal appearance by Alice Cooper on the tracks "Two for the Road" and "Holy Man's War". 
For this album Icon toured with, among others, Ace Frehley of Kiss fame and Electric Angels in the US, and with King's X in the U.K. For the last part of the tour, David Lauser, of Sammy Hagar's band, replaced drummer Dixon. The video for the first single "Taking My Breath Away" was played on MTV´s Headbangers Ball in Europe and in the US.

Track list
 "Right Between the Eyes" (Dan Wexler, Jerry Harrison, Pat Dixon, Tracy Wallach) – 5:13
 "Two for the Road" (Harrison) – 3:54
 "Taking My Breath Away" (Wexler, Harrison, Dixon, Wallach) – 4:36
 "A Far Cry" (Wexler, Harrison, Dixon, Wallach) – 4:19
 "In Your Eyes" (Wexler, Harrison) – 4:00
 "Holy Man's War" (Wexler, Harrison, Dixon, Wallach) – 7:16
 "Bad Times" (Wexler, Harrison) – 3:25
 "Double Life" (Wexler, Harrison, Dixon, Wallach) – 4:06
 "Forever Young" (Wexler, Harrison) – 3:50
 "Running Under Fire" (Wexler, Harrison) – 4:26
 "Peace & Love" (instrumental) (Wexler, Dixon, Wallach) – 1:19

Personnel
Icon
Jerry Harrison – vocals, vocal arrangements
Dan Wexler – guitars, guitar synthesizer, producer
Drew Bollmann – guitars (credited, not actually playing on the album)
Tracy Wallach – bass, vocals, vocal arrangements
Pat Dixon – drums

Additional musicians
Alice Cooper – guest vocals on "Two for the Road", featured character on "Holy Man's War"
Kevin Stroller – keyboards
Mark Prentice – keyboards on "Forever Young"
 
Production
Steve Escallier – engineer, vocal arrangements
Rich Spector – 2nd engineer
Scott Mabuchi – mixing at Sigma Sound Studios, New York
Lolly Grodner – mixing assistant
Ted Jensen – mastering at Sterling Sound, New York
Ed Trunk and Dan Zelisko – executive producers
"Alive and Well in Hell" produced and written by Tracy Wallach

References

1989 albums
Icon (band) albums
Atlantic Records albums
Megaforce Records albums